Rimont is a commune in the Ariège department in southwestern France.

Population
Inhabitants of Rimont are called Rimontais.

See also
Communes of the Ariège department

References

Communes of Ariège (department)
Languedoc
Ariège communes articles needing translation from French Wikipedia